Awards and honours received by Suharto, Indonesia dictator president from 1967 to 1998, include:

National honours
namely:
  Star of the Republic of Indonesia, 1st Class
  Star of Mahaputera, 1st Class
  The Sacred Star
  Military Distinguished Service Star
  Guerrilla Star
  Star of Merit, 1st Class
  Star of Culture Parama Dharma
  Star of Yudha Dharma, 1st Class
  Star of Kartika Eka Paksi, 1st Class
  Star of Jalasena, 1st Class
  Star of Swa Bhuwana Paksa, 1st Class
  Star of Bhayangkara, 1st Class
  Star of Kartika Eka Paksi, 2st Class
  Star of Kartika Eka Paksi, 3st Class
  Indonesian Armed Forces "8 Years" Service Star
  Garuda Star
  Military Campaign Medal
  Military Long Service Medal, 16 Years Service
  1st Independence War Medal
  2nd Independence War Medal
  Military Operational Service Medal for Madiun 1947
  Military Operational Service Medal for Angkatan Ratu Adil 1947
  Military Operational Service Medal for Republik Malaku Selatan 1950
  Military Operational Service Medal for Sulawesi 1958
  Military Service Medal for Irian Jaya 1962
  Northern Borneo Military Campaign Medal
  Medal for Combat Against Communists

International honours
:
 Grand Star (Groß-Stern) of the Decoration of Honour for Services to the Republic of Austria (1973)
:
 Grand Cordon of the Order of Leopold (1973)
:
 Recipient of the Royal Family Order of the Crown of Brunei (DKMB) (1988)
 Recipient of the Most Esteemed Family Order of Laila Utama (DK) (1988)
:
 Grand Collar of the National Order of Independence (1968)
:
 Grand Collar of the Order of the Nile (1977)
:
 Grand Cordon and Collar of the Order of the Queen of Sheba (1968)
:
 Grand Cross of the National Order
of the Legion of Honour
:
 Grand Cross Special Class of the Order of Merit of the Federal Republic of Germany
:
 Knight Grand Cross with Collar of the Order of Merit of the Italian Republic (OMRI) (1972)
:
 Grand Cordon of the Supreme Order of the Chrysanthemum (1968)
:
 Grand Cordon with Collar of the Order of Al-Hussein bin Ali (1986)
:
 Collar of the Order of Mubarak the Great (1977)
:
 Honorary Recipient of the Most Exalted Order of the Crown of the Realm (DMN) (1988)
: 
 Recipient Member of the Most Esteemed Royal Family Order of Perak (D.K. Perak) (1988)
: 
 Grand Commander of the Most Esteemed Royal Family Order of Johor (D.K. Johor) (1990)
:
 Knight Grand Cross of the Order of the Netherlands Lion (1970)
:
 Nishan-e-Pakistan (NPk) (1982)
:
 First Class of the Order of Pahlavi
:
 Grand Collar (Raja) of the Order of Sikatuna (GCS) (1968)
 Grand Collar (Maringal na Kuwintas) of the Order of the Golden Heart (GCGH) (1968)
:
 Collar of the Order of the Independence
:
 First Class of the Order of the Star of the Romanian Socialist Republic (1982)
:
 Badr Chain (1977)
:
 Recipient of the Order of Temasek (DUT) (1974)
:
 Grand Cross of the Order of Good Hope (1997)
:
 Grand Order of Mugunghwa (1981)
:
 Grand Cross with Collar of the Order of Isabella the Catholic (CYC) (1980)
:
 Member 1st Class of the Order of the Umayyads (1977)
:
 Knight of the Most Auspicious Order of the Rajamitrabhorn (KRM) (1970)
:
 First Class of the Order of Prince Yaroslav the Wise (1997)
:
 Honorary Knight Grand Cross (Military Division) of the Most Honourable Order of the Bath (G.C.B.) (1974)
:
 Grand Cordon with Collar of the Order of the Liberator (1988)
:
 Yugoslav Star with Sash of the Order of the Yugoslav Star (1975)

Others
Suharto's childhood house in Kemusuk is currently a memorial museum, called Memorial Jenderal Besar HM Soeharto. A statue of him stand in the front of the museum. It was built by Probosutedjo and was inaugurated in 2013.

FELDA Soeharto, a village in Selangor, Malaysia, is named in 1977 after him – previously in 1970 he paid a visit to the village as a part of momentous visit to normalize Indonesia-Malaysia relations.

References

Suharto
Indonesia-related lists
Suharto
Honorary Knights Grand Cross of the Order of the Bath
Grand Crosses Special Class of the Order of Merit of the Federal Republic of Germany
Collars of the Order of Isabella the Catholic
Recipients of orders, decorations, and medals of Ethiopia